Brushfire Records is a record label owned by singer-songwriter Jack Johnson. Formerly known as The Moonshine Conspiracy Records, the label was founded to release soundtracks for Woodshed Films, a company owned by Johnson, Emmett Malloy, and Chris Malloy to produce the surfing documentary Thicker than Water.

The label has released several of Johnson's albums, including Sing-A-Longs and Lullabies for the Film Curious George, In Between Dreams, Sleep Through the Static, To the Sea, From Here to Now to You, and All the Light Above It Too.

Artists

Roster
 Animal Liberation Orchestra (2006–Present)
 Bahamas (2009–Present)
 Zach Gill (2008–Present)
 Neil Halstead (2008–Present)
 Jack Johnson (2002–Present)
Paula Fuga (2021–Present)

Past artists
 Donavon Frankenreiter (2002–2006)
 Money Mark (2006)
 Rogue Wave (2007–2013)
Matt Costa (2006–2018)
G. Love & Special Sauce (2004–2020)

Films 
 Thicker than Water (2000)
 The September Sessions (2002)
 Sprout (2005)
 A Brokedown Melody (2006)
 The Present (2009)
180 Degrees South: Conquerors of the Useless (2010)
The Smog of the Sea (2017)

Soundtracks
 Sing-A-Longs and Lullabies for the Film Curious George (2006)
 This Warm December: A Brushfire Holiday, Vol. 1 (2008)
This Warm December: A Brushfire Holiday, Vol. 2 (2011)
The Tribes of Palos Verdes (2017)
This Warm December: A Brushfire Holiday, Vol. 3 (2019)

References

External links
 Official Brushfire Records website
 Woodshed Films website

American record labels
Record labels established in 2002
Hawaiian music
Surf music
Rock record labels
Pop record labels
2002 establishments in Hawaii